In mathematics, Carathéodory's theorem is a theorem in complex analysis, named after Constantin Carathéodory, which extends the Riemann mapping theorem. The theorem, first proved in 1913, states that any conformal mapping sending the unit disk to some region in the complex plane bounded by a Jordan curve extends continuously to a homeomorphism from the unit circle onto the Jordan curve. The result is one of Carathéodory's results on prime ends and the boundary behaviour of univalent holomorphic functions.

Proofs of Carathéodory's theorem 

Clearly if f admits an extension to a homeomorphism, then ∂U must be a Jordan curve.

Conversely if ∂U is a Jordan curve, the first step is to prove f extends continuously to the closure of D.  In fact this will hold if and only if f is uniformly continuous on D: for this is true if it has a continuous extension to the closure of D; and, if f is uniformly continuous, it is easy to check f has limits on the unit circle and the same inequalities for uniform continuity hold on the closure of D.

Suppose that f is not uniformly continuous. In this case there must be an ε > 0 and a point ζ on the unit circle and sequences zn, wn tending to ζ with |f(zn) − f(wn)| ≥ 2ε. This is shown below to lead to a contradiction, so that f must be uniformly continuous and hence has a continuous extension to the closure of D.

For 0 < r < 1, let γr be the curve given by the arc of the circle | z − ζ | = r lying within D. Then f ∘ γr is a Jordan curve. Its length can be estimated using the Cauchy–Schwarz inequality:

Hence there is a "length-area estimate":

The finiteness of the integral on the left hand side implies that there is a sequence rn decreasing to 0 with  tending to 0. But the length of a curve g(t) for t in (a, b) is given by

The finiteness of  therefore implies that the curve has limiting points an, bn at its two ends with |an – bn| ≤  , so this distance, as well as diameter of the curve, tends to 0. These two limit points must lie on ∂U, because f is a homeomorphism between D and U and thus a sequence converging in U has to be the image under f of a sequence converging in D. By assumption there exist a homeomorphism β between the circle ∂D and ∂U. Since β−1 is uniformly continuous, the distance between the two points ξn and ηn corresponding to an and bn in ∂U must tend to 0. So eventually the smallest circular arc in ∂D joining ξn and ηn is defined. Denote  τn image of this arc under β. By uniform continuity of β, diameter of τn in ∂U tends to 0. Together τn and f ∘ γrn form a simple Jordan curve. Its interior Un is contained in U by the Jordan curve theorem for ∂U and ∂Un: to see this, notice that U is the interior of ∂U, as it is bounded, connected and it is both open and closed in the complement of ∂U; so the exterior region of ∂U is unbounded, connected and does not intersect ∂Un, hence its closure is contained in the closure of the exterior of ∂Un; taking complements, we get the desired inclusion. The diameter of ∂Un tends to 0 because the diameters of  τn and f ∘ γrn tend to 0. Hence the diameter of Un tend to 0. (For  is compact set, hence  contains two points u and v  such that distance between them is maximal. It is easy to see that u and v must lie in ∂U and diameters of both U and ∂U equal .)

Now if Vn denotes the intersection of D with the disk |z − ζ| < rn, then for all sufficiently large n f(Vn) = Un. Indeed, the arc γrn divides D into Vn and complementary region , so under the conformal homeomorphism f the curve f ∘ γrn divides U into  and
Diameter of  does not decrease with increasing n, for  implies .

So the diameter of f(Vn) tends to 0. On the other hand, passing to subsequences of (zn) and (wn) if necessary, it may be assumed that zn and wn both lie in Vn. But this gives a contradiction since |f(zn) − f(wn)| ≥ ε. So f must be uniformly continuous on U.

Thus f extends continuously to the closure of D. Since f(D) = U, by compactness f carries the closure of D onto the closure of U and hence ∂D onto ∂U. If f is not one-one, there are points u, v on ∂D with u ≠ v and f(u) = f(v). Let X and Y be the radial lines from 0 to u and v. Then f(X ∪ Y) is a Jordan curve. Arguing as before, its interior V is contained in U and is a connected component of U \ f(X ∪ Y). On the other hand, D \ (X ∪ Y) is the disjoint union of two open sectors
W1 and W2. Hence, for one of them, W1 say, f(W1) = V. Let Z be the portion of ∂W1 on the unit circle, so that Z is a closed arc and f(Z) is a subset of both ∂U and the closure of V. But their intersection is a single point and hence f is constant on Z. By the Schwarz reflection principle, f can be analytically continued by conformal reflection across the circular arc. Since non-constant holomorphic functions have isolated zeros, this forces f to be constant, a contradiction. So f is one-one and hence a homeomorphism on the closure of D.

The first proof follows Carathéodory's original method of proof from 1913 using properties of Lebesgue measure on the circle: the continuous extension of the inverse function g of f to ∂U is justified by Fatou's theorem on the boundary behaviour of bounded harmonic functions on the unit disk.

|h(a)| ≤ mt ⋅ M1 − t,

where 0 ≤ t ≤ 1, M is maximum modulus of h for sequential limits on ∂U and m is the maximum modulus of h for sequential limits on ∂U lying in a sector centred on a subtending an angle 2πt at a.

Continuous extension and the Carathéodory-Torhorst theorem 

An extension of the theorem states that a conformal isomorphism

,

This result is often also attributed to Carathéodory, but was first stated and proved by Marie Torhorst in her 1918 thesis, under the supervision of Hans Hahn, using Carathéodory's theory of prime ends. More precisely, Torhorst proved that local connectivity is equivalent to the domain having only prime ends of the first kind. By the theory of prime ends, the latter property, in turn, is equivalent to  having a continuous extension.

Notes

References 
 
 
 
 
 
 
 
 
 
 
 
 
 
 
 

Conformal mappings
Homeomorphisms
Theorems in complex analysis